All or Nothing: Juventus is an Amazon Original docuseries as part of the All or Nothing brand. In the series, Italian Serie A side Juventus's progress was charted through their 2020–21 season.

The series was produced by Fulwell 73 and premiered on 25 November 2021.

Plot
All or Nothing: Juventus features a turbulent season for the club. Despite winning two trophies, the 2020–21 Coppa Italia and the 2020 Supercoppa Italiana, newly appointed coach Andrea Pirlo failed to lead the club to the tenth Serie A title in a row and was knocked out in the round of 16 of the Champions League by Porto.

Episodes

References

External links 
 

Juventus
Juventus F.C. in popular culture
Association football documentary television series
Amazon Prime Video original programming
2021 British television series debuts
Television series by Amazon Studios